is a district on the western outskirts of Kyoto, Japan. It also refers to the mountain across the Ōi River, which forms a backdrop to the district. Arashiyama is a nationally designated Historic Site and Place of Scenic Beauty.

Notable tourist sites
Arashiyama Bamboo Grove
The Iwatayama Monkey Park on the slopes of Arashiyama. Over 170 monkeys live at the park. While the monkeys are wild, they have become accustomed to humans. The park is on a small mountain not far from the Saga-Arashiyama rail station. Visitors can approach and photograph the monkeys. At the summit is a fenced enclosure where visitors can feed the monkeys.
The "Moon Crossing Bridge" (渡月橋, Togetsukyō), notable for its views of cherry blossoms and autumn colors on the slopes of Arashiyama.
The tombstone of the Heike courtesan Kogo of Sagano.
Tenryū-ji, the main temple of one of the 15 branches of the Rinzai school, one of the two main sects of Zen Buddhism in Japan.
The hamlet of Kiyotaki, a small scenic village at the base of Mt. Atago, the home to a notable Shinto shrine.
Matsunoo-taisha, a shrine half a mile south of the area, is home to a blessed spring. It is one of the oldest shrines in the Kyoto area, founded in 700. The alleged restorative properties of the spring bring many local sake and miso companies for prayers that their product will be blessed.
Kameyama koen has a stone commemorating Zhou Enlai's visit to Arashiyama. He was moved by the cherry blossoms and mountain greenery. The four poems he wrote about his visit are engraved on a stone monument: "Arashiyama in the Rain."
Ōkōchi Sansō, the Japanese-style home and gardens of the film actor Denjirō Ōkōchi.
Cherry trees bloom in spring and leaves turn red in autumn.
The Sagano bamboo forest is a famous attraction for tourists, which is present near the Tenryū-ji temple.

Transport
Arashiyama is a walkable area accessible by the Keifuku Electric Railroad (via Arashiyama Station (Keifuku)) from central Kyoto or by the Hankyū Arashiyama Line (via Arashiyama Station (Hankyu)) from Katsura Station, with connections from Osaka and Kyoto. Additionally, the JR Saga-Arashiyama Station is located in the district's suburbs.

Togetsukyō

Togetsukyō (渡月橋) is a bridge across the river. It is the subject of one of the Famous Views of the Sixty-odd Provinces ukiyo-e prints. The Japanese used mostly concrete in 1934 to rebuild the Togetsukyo Bridge, unlike the original destroyed wooden version of the bridge from 836.

The river has three different names that denote its upper, middle, and lower stretches.

References

External links 
 
 Pictures of Kyoto, Arashiyama (including Sagano, Katsura river, Takebayashi Street)
 (Arashiyama Park) 
 (Togetsukyō)
 (JR Station)
 (Randen Station)
 (Hankyū Station)

Geography of Kyoto
Places of Scenic Beauty
Historic Sites of Japan
Tourist attractions in Kyoto